The NHL YoungStars Game was an annual match held as part of the National Hockey League All-Star Game weekend activities, which ran from the 2002 All-Star Game to the 2009 game, featuring notable young NHL players and leading prospects.  

Replacing the Heroes of Hockey Old-Timers matches during the All-Star Weekend activities, the first four games were played as separate games to the actual All-Star Game, but starting in 2008, it was changed to become part of the NHL Super Skills Competition, with the winning team gaining a point for their conference. It was not held in 2005 due to that year's league lockout, or in 2006 due to the All-Star Game not being held so that NHL players could participate in the 2006 Winter Olympics.  Through the years, the game implemented different formats and rules.  It was discontinued after 2009 and has not been played since.

2002 National Hockey League All-Star Game

The Format
The game's format:
 Four skaters (and one goaltender) per side.
 The duration of the first and second periods was 12 minutes, running time. The third period was 11 minutes, running time, plus a final minute of stop time. There was a four-minute break between periods.

The players were divided into two teams and led behind the bench by former Los Angeles Kings player and broadcaster Jim Fox and former NHL player, Kings head coach, and ESPN analyst Barry Melrose.

The Game
Atlanta's rookie star Ilya Kovalchuk scored six goals to pace Team Melrose to a 13–7 victory over Team Fox. Kovalchuk scored four times at even strength, once short-handed, and once on a penalty shot; his sixth goal came against an empty net at the end of the game. Kovalchuk was named the first-ever YoungStars MVP. The Edmonton Oilers' forward Mike Comrie scored three goals and added an assist to lead Team Fox in scoring.

Notes
 y — were named as injury replacements.
 Krystofer Kolanos (Phoenix Coyotes) and Rostislav Klesla (Columbus Blue Jackets) were selected to play for Team Melrose, but were unable to play due to injury.
 Martin Havlat (Ottawa Senators) and Alex Tanguay (Colorado Avalanche) were selected to play for Team Fox, but were unable to play due to injury.

2003 National Hockey League All-Star Game

The Format
The assistant coaches of the teams with the best points percentages in their respective conferences were selected as coaches for the Eastern Conference and Western Conference YoungStars, respectively.

The YoungStars players were selected by the NHL's Hockey Operations Department, in consultation with League General Managers.

The game's format:
 The game was played using five skaters and one goaltender per team.
 The duration was three 10-minute periods, running time with 15-second stops after goals.
 There was a four-minute break between periods.
 The Eastern Conference was considered the "home" team.

The Game
Washington's Brian Sutherby won the MVP award for the Eastern Conference YoungStars by scoring two goals and an assist as the East cruised to an easy 8–3 victory. Stephen Weiss of the host team Florida Panthers scored a goal and an assist for the East.

Erik Cole (Carolina Hurricanes) was named to the YoungStars game, but did not play due to a broken leg he suffered two days before the game.
Ales Hemsky (Edmonton Oilers) was named to the YoungStars game, but did not play and was replaced by Horcoff.

2004 National Hockey League All-Star Game

The Format
The game went back to the four-on-four format with each roster consisting of six forwards, four defensemen, and one goaltender. The game was played in three 10-minute running-clock periods and a four-minute intermission between each period.  The head coaches of the game were Lou Nanne and Tom Reid, both former players of the relocated Minnesota North Stars, with Minnesota being the venue of the All-Star Game for the first time in twenty seasons.

The Game
The Western Conference defeated the Eastern Conference 7–3. Anaheim's Joffrey Lupul scored a hat trick, San Jose's Jonathan Cheechoo picked up four assists, and Colorado goaltender Philippe Sauve was named the Game's MVP, stopping 18 of 21 shots.

Garnet Exelby (Atlanta Thrashers) was named to the YoungStars game, but did not play and was replaced by Stajan.

2007 National Hockey League All-Star Game

The Format
The format was unchanged from the 2004 game. The assistant coaches in the NHL All-Star Game were chosen as the head coaches for the YoungStars Game.

The Game
The East's win was spurred by the six points from YoungStars MVP Zach Parise of the New Jersey Devils who had two goals and four assists, while Boston's Phil Kessel recorded a hat-trick just one month removed from undergoing successful surgery for testicular cancer.

2008 National Hockey League All-Star Game

The Format
The game was reduced to two 6-minute periods. In addition, the NHL made the YoungStars game part of the SuperSkills Competition. Furthermore, rookie goaltenders did not participate; instead, the veterans selected to play in the regular All-Star game participated.  The coaches were the same head coaches for the main All-Star game.

The Game
Two first period goals and an assist by Brandon Dubinsky gave the East a 6-2 lead.  Nicklas Backstrom added one more for the East in the second period, before the West YoungStars made it a close game by scoring four consecutive goals in less than three minutes. Dubinsky was named the MVP.

2009 National Hockey League All-Star Game

The Format
For the final YoungStars match, the format returned to three periods for a total playing time of 18 minutes (6 minutes per period) featuring a three-on-three (four including the goalkeeper) rookies versus sophomores format, consisting of three six-minute periods with the clock stopping only within the last minute of each game. Coaching the rookies was future Hall of Famer Luc Robitaille, and for the sophomores, former All-Star Pete Mahovlich. Pekka Rinne (who replaced Steve Mason) made 20 saves in a 9-5 victory for the rookies. Rookie Blake Wheeler was named the MVP after scoring three goals.

The Game

 Milan Lucic was named to the YoungStars game, but did not play.
 Erik Ersberg was named to the YoungStars game, but did not play.
 Steve Mason was named to the YoungStars game, but did not play.
 Nicklas Backstrom was named to the YoungStars game, but did not play.
 Kris Versteeg was named to the YoungStars game, but did not dress.

References

External links

YoungStars Game
Recurring sporting events established in 2002